The Homesteaders is a 1953 American Western film directed by Lewis D. Collins, and starring Bill Elliott, Robert Lowery, and Emmett Lynn.

Cast
Bill Elliott as Mace Corbin
Robert Lowery as Clyde Moss
Emmett Lynn as Old Grimer
George Wallace as Meade  
Robert "Buzz" Henry as Charlie
Stanley Price as Van
Rick Vallin as Slim
William Fawcett as Hector
James Seay as John Kroger
Tom Monroe as Henchman Jake  
Barbara Woodell as Jenny Moss
Ray Walker as Colonel Peterson

References

External links

1953 Western (genre) films
American Western (genre) films
Allied Artists films
Films directed by Lewis D. Collins
Films scored by Raoul Kraushaar
American black-and-white films
1950s English-language films
1950s American films